Mantic Ritual (formerly Meltdown) is an American thrash metal band from Pittsburgh, Pennsylvania. They released their only album, Executioner, in 2009.

History

Origin (2004–2007) 
Under the name Meltdown, Mantic Ritual began writing and recording music in Pittsburgh, Pennsylvania around 2004. After the addition of guitarist Jeff Potts, the band moved to Hollywood, California in 2007 and quickly signed with metal label Nuclear Blast.

Executioner, Departure of Dan Wetmore (2008–2009) 
Citing legal reasons, the band chose to abandon the name Meltdown. This was also done to avoid confusion with other bands currently using the name. The band renamed themselves Mantic Ritual and moved back to their hometown of Pittsburgh, participating in national tours with bands including Rotting Christ and Destruction.

The band then recorded their debut album, Executioner, with famed metal producer Andy Classen (Dew-Scented, Rotting Christ) at Stage-one Studios in Borgentreich, Germany. It was released in Europe on February 27, 2009 and in the US on March 10, 2009.

On September 15, 2009, six months after the US release of Executioner, Mantic Ritual announced through their MySpace that guitarist/vocalist Dan Wetmore was leaving the band to pursue photography. Wetmore said that although he enjoyed playing with the band and writing music, he could not see himself spending life on the road. In the same announcement, Mantic Ritual also stated that Grave Desire frontman Dave Watson, a good friend of the band, was to fill in for Dan as a temporary replacement for the September/October 2009 shows. Within a few weeks, Watson was asked to be the permanent guitarist/vocalist for Mantic Ritual, and soon played full-time with the band.

Breakup and one-off reunion (2010–2020) 
Mantic Ritual announced in August 2010 that drummer Adam Haritan had left the band. The news was released on the band's Facebook page, and on metalunderground's website. The reason for Haritan's departure was described as mutual, due to Haritan's loss of interest in playing music full-time. After more than a year of silence from the band, Guitarist Jeff Potts was asked by the website Metalsucks.net for an update on Mantic Ritual's status. He said during the interview that he and bassist Ben Mottsman had relocated to Los Angeles, while vocalist Dave Watson had not.

"This is a really long-winded way of saying that Mantic Ritual is finished", Potts said during the interview. As of May 2012, Potts is working on a power metal project. Mottsman and Potts joined thrash metal band Warbringer.

In 2013, the band reformed for a one-off show at Thrash de Mayo, with original singer/guitarist Dan Wetmore along with Warbringer's Carlos Cruz filling in on drums.

Comeback and Heart Set Stone EP (2021–present) 
By 2021, Mantic Ritual had once again reformed, featuring the same as lineup as their temporary reunion from 2013: Dan Wetmore (vocals, guitars), Jeff Potts (guitars), Ben Mottsman (bass) and Carlos Cruz (drums). It was announced on August 2, 2021, that the band had signed to M-Theory Audio and will release their first album in 13 years in 2022. In June 2022, the band announced their upcoming release would be an EP titled Heart Set Stone, which was released on September 2.

Discography 
Studio albums
 Executioner (2009)

EPs
 Heart Set Stone (2022)

References

External links 
 
 Nuclear Blast artist page
 Mantic Ritual at MySpace

Musical groups established in 2004
American thrash metal musical groups
Heavy metal musical groups from Pennsylvania
Musical groups from Pittsburgh
Nuclear Blast artists